The Wall Street Mill in Joshua Tree National Park was a complete and operable gold ore crushing mill featuring late-19th century two-stamp mill machinery. Consequently, the significance encompasses the mill machinery, the building which houses it, the well which supplied water for the mill's operation, and the well pump. It is the only gold ore crushing mill in the region that retains integrity.

The stamp mill building is framed with heavy timber and built on a downward sloping hillside to take advantage of gravity in the milling process. The roof and some of the exterior walls are covered with corrugated sheet metal, while some of the exterior walls have either vertical or horizontal wooden siding. At the top of the building a long wooden ramp supports the track of an ore tramway which carried ore from where it was unloaded from trucks to the top of the mill above the two-stamp Baker Iron Works crusher. A gasoline engine powered the mill; it was built by the Western Gas Engine Company of Los Angeles. A Myer concentrating table was used in separating the gold from the ore.

The complex included the mill, a well, a bunkhouse and an outhouse. The supporting buildings are largely ruinous.

The mill was built by Bill Keys, a local rancher, miner and character, using equipment moved from Pinon Wells. In the 1940s, Keys was involved in a dispute with Worth Bagley over access to the Wall Street Mill. Keys shot and killed Bagley in 1943. Keys then turned himself and was convicted of manslaughter. He was sent to San Quentin State Penitentiary for 10 years. Bill's wife Frances wrote to lawyer Earle Stanley Gardner for help and with the lawyers aide, had Bill's case reopened. They found many facts that were not brought out during the trial leading to Bill's release. He served 5 years of a 10 year sentence and ultimately received a full pardon. Upon arriving back home from prison, the very first thing Bill did, was placing a stone commemorating the event with the inscription: "Here is where Worth Bagley bit the dust at the hand of W. F. Keys, May 11, 1943." The marker is not a part of the Wall Street Mill historic district.

See also
Keys Desert Queen Ranch
Desert Queen Mine
Cow Camp
Barker Dam

References

External links

National Register of Historic Places in Joshua Tree National Park
Mines in California
Industrial buildings completed in 1933
Industrial buildings and structures on the National Register of Historic Places in California
National Register of Historic Places in San Bernardino County, California
Historic American Engineering Record in California
Gold mining in California
Stamp mills